The Reformed Churches in Namibia is a confessional Reformed church in Namibia. Reformed people come from Angola to Namibia in 1929. The Dorslandtrekkers were mostly Reformed people who had settled in Angola  but later moved to Namibia. The Dorslandtrekkers were originally from Transvaal, South Africa, and migrated northwestward starting in 1874 in two large and one smaller group, starting the Humpata Reformed Church under the Rev. Jan Lion Cachet. Later in 1930 3 congregations were established. More farmers came and the church grew. Missionary work was started in 1969 under the Bushmans of the Gobabis region, Botswana.
It has 2,757 members and 14 congregations, and adheres to the Apostles Creed, Nicene Creed, Heidelberg Catechism, Belgic Confession and the Canons of Dort.There's no women ordination. Official languages are Afrikaans, Bushman, Gobabis-Kung.

Reasons for repatriation 
An unsuccessful effort was made as early as 1883 to get the Angola-Afrikaners to return to Transvaal. For some time, the emigrants led a very comfortable life, but remained strangers to the land. The coming of the railways eroded their living from wagon shipping, and their hunting revenue declined. Agricultural consolidation also worked against them. Relationships with the Portuguese authorities deteriorated as the latter came to rely less on the Trekkers to teach them animal husbandry and shooting. The Swedish traveler and Army officer Peter Möller commented as early as 1895-1896 on some of the many reasons the Afrikaners may want to leave Angola: "The Boers could not obtain full citizenship, gain full ownership of their farms, or teach their children in Afrikaans, and their [Protestant] faith was threatened while their chance to make a living farming or shipping declined."

Leaders of the Afrikaner community petitioned the Union government to help them return to South African territory, especially in the South West Africa (SWA) mandate. After negotiations between the Portuguese governor and the Union land minister, the Gen. J.B.M. Hertzog government pledged £500,000 for the second great trek of the Angola-Boers south across the Cunene River to SWA. On August 22, 1928, the first group crossed the Kunene near Swartbooisdrift, and by February 27, 1929, 1,922 people, including 373 families, had been repatriated to SWA. A number of people also emigrated to SWA and South Africa by ship in 1928-29. Not all 420 families issued certificates for the purpose emigrated. Many Afrikaners in northern Angola, who may not have been aware of the migration, were not issued certificates then, but the last Afrikaners returned from Angola in 1930-31.

Church founding 
The approximately 300 whites who arrived in Angola in 1880 were almost all affiliated to the Reformed Churches in South Africa (GKSA or Gereformeerde Kerk), and so the Humpata church was affiliated with that denomination by the church council. In 1928, however, quite a few Angola-Boers were affiliated to the Dutch Reformed Churches in South Africa (NHK), the result of a schism in Angola in 1908. Therefore, the first three congregations of the NHK also stemmed from the repatriation in 1937: in Gobabis on July 31, in Otjiwarongo on August 21, and in Grootfontein on September 4. After the repatriation, there remained in Angola only 15 members of the NHK in Angola, but 35 whole families in the GKSA. The NHK in Humpata did not disband until 1958 (with the last great repatriation), while the Humpata Reformed Church had already done so in 1926. The disparity persists in Namibia today in the GKSA's Namibian numbers of 2,000 confirmed members and the NHK's local tally of 1,058.

The schism in the Reformed Churches erupted at an April 6, 1908 church council meeting, where it became apparent that most members of the Humpata congregation differed from the Synod over the mission. The following day, 118 members renounced their GKSA membership, objecting to their pastor, Rev. H.P.J. Pasch (Humpata pastor from 1908 to 1911) preaching to the native mat volk ("tame folks," as the Boers called the servants they brought with them on their journey) and administering sacraments only every three months. On April 18 of the same year, 124 members informed the Synod they needed to withdraw from the Reformed Church because their sense of the mission was "at odds with the insights of the Synod." Some withdrew their resignation soon afterward. Appeals by the schismatics to the Dutch Reformed Church in the Netherlands proper failed when the latter declared the NHK position Scripturally erroneous and advised the malcontents to reconcile themselves with the Rev. Pasch and the South African church that had spiritually and financially nurtured them, a prospect with which the schismatics were dissatisfied.

Therefore, the Rev. Pieter van Drimmelen founded the NHK congregation in Humpata on May 31, 1910. After the Rev. Van Drimmelen drew up the bylaws, 34 people signed them, all but one heads of household. On January 11, 1919, the Mombolo NHK congregation was also founded by the Rev. Van Drimmelen with 14 charter members. He died on his return to Humpata. In 1923, the NHK Rev. S.J. Strydom described ecumenical relations between the GKSA and NHK in Angola to still be poor, but not as "miserably bad" as immediately after the schism. By 1926, the controversy had largely subsided, however. GKSA members attended NHK services, but there were some NHK worshippers who would never set foot in a GKSA church.

The GKSA and NHK thus were both tasked with participating in a church council in the mandate lands. The Dutch Reformed Churches in South Africa (NGK), which had almost no Dorsland Trekker members and urged the few remaining ones after the evacuation to turn to the GKSA. In fact, the Gobabis Reformed Church (NGK), the main center for the repatriated Afrikaners, was founded in 1939, nine years before the local GKSA church and two years before the local NHK one. The Aranos (1952) and Outjo (1943) were also not the result of repatriation.

Founding of Gobabis 
Angola-Boers made up the bulk of the Gobabis Reformed Church, founded in 1930 under the GKSA.

In Kerk in 'n beter land: Die Kerkverhaal van die Dorsland- en Angolatrekkers 1873–1937, J.M. van Tonder (ed.) writes as follows about the Afrikaners' role in the founding of the settlement: "The Particular Synod of the Cape Reformed Church had, on May 26, 1930, delegated the Rev. H.S. van Jaarsveld to seek out members from Angola and South Africa and organize a church to guide them in the Word and the Sacrament. The Rev. Van Jaarsveld met with the elders Sarel du Plessis and E.T. Meyer and traveled to Farm 412, where a large group of parishioners awaited." Prof. Dr. Jooste write in his Gedenkboek van die Dorstandtrek:

During the first week of June, the Rev. Van Jaarsveld concentrated on testimonial catechism. On Saturday, June 6, 1930 (actually the next day), the Gobabis congregation was founded (on the Auheib farm). The Rev. Van Jaarseveld blessed the inauguration with the words of Ephesians 2:19-22: 'Consequently, you are no longer foreigners and strangers, but fellow citizens with God's people and also members of his household, built on the foundation of the apostles and prophets, with Christ Jesus himself as the chief cornerstone. In him the whole building is joined together and rises to become a holy temple in the Lord. And in him you too are being built together to become a dwelling in which God lives by his Spirit.'

On June 6, 1930, all the church councilors of Angola gathered to approve the new congregation. An emotional moment arose when the last minutes from a meeting in Humpata, Angola, were read, approved, and signed by the council. Grounds acquisition was discussed, and the Humpata church council agreed to stay active until the foundation. A letter would also be sent to GKSA members in Ghanzi, Botswana, to which Gobabis would be the nearest GKSA congregation. On Saturday, June 7, 1930 (the Gobabis congregation's foundation date), the Reformed Church members gathered at Helew 408 farm, near the house of P.C. Akkerman, to pitch the tent. There were 364 confirmed and 462 baptized members, altogether 826, in the new Gobabis S.W.A. Reformed Church. The Rev. Van Jaarsveld, the chairman, explained to the congregation that the existing Angola church council had been dissolved and a new one needed to be elected, which it then was by secret ballot. The new councilors would be confirmed during the dedication service. As in Angola, a cattle fund was established to which people were expected to contribute to the best of their ability.

Also in 1930, the Gibeon and Outjo congregations were founded, because the Gibeon district (on the Nossob River) and the Outjo district were the two remaining locales toward which Afrikaners had returned from Angola. Gibeon's name was changed in 1938 to Omrah and in 1959 to Aranos.

Further foundations 
The first GKSA pastor in South West Africa was the Rev. H.F.V. Kruger, who founded the Reddersburg Reformed Church with A.S.E. Yasel on the Halma farm on November 14, 1931. Kruger served in all three congregations (Gibeon, Outjo, and Gobabis), and also visited Keetmanshoop, where a congregation was founded in 1936. The members in Ghanzi, Bechuanaland, were also his responsibility. The members there founded a church in 1948, but it was dissolved in 1973. The Rev. Kruger left the area in 1935 to become pastor in Fauresmith, Free State. On May 17 of that year, he left the SWA congregations, leaving them without a pastor until 1939, and so they sought various pastors from the Union (Cape Particular Synod). More Namibian congregations came and went:

 Usakos Reformed Church (1953-1960)
 Bitterwater Reformed Church (Windhoek district) (1935-1964)
 Bethanie Reformed Church (1969-1975)
 Kamanjab Reformed Church (1969-1977)
 Erongo Reformed Church (1972-1982)
 Oshakati Reformed Church (1988-1990)
 Rundu Reformed Church (1988-1993)

After several candidates were interviewed in vain, the Rev. J.L. van der Merwe from the Kuruman Reformed Church was hired for the Gobabis parish, and confirmed as such on March 3, 1939 to serve Gobabis, Windhoek, Bitterwater, Omrah, and Keetmanshoop. He occasionally visited Ghanzi as well. Outjo was then served by Cape pastors; the Rev. H.S. van Jaarsveld was the main one active there. The Rev. Van der Merwe went to Windhoek first, but difficulties serving the area from there led him to relocate to Gobabis in May 1940. The financial prognosis of the congregations was poor, requiring most to travel by train to Windhoek or Keetmanshoop. It took several days to make the journey. When visiting Bitterwater and Omrah (Aranos) by car, he was often gone from Gobabis for eleven days. However, the ministry was easier than it had been for the Rev. Kruger, in part thanks to improved roads in the area. The Rev. Van der Merwe worked hard to build the Gobabis church, but World War II delayed his plans, so it would not be until October 27, 1944, that he would return to begin construction.

The Keetmanshoop Reformed Church, the fifth GKSA church in Namibia to be founded in 1936, was the first unrelated to the repatriation, since most members were immigrants from the Cape and Transvaal provinces of South Africa who had settled around Keetmanshoop, Mariental, and Karasburg. The sixth and last congregation founded before World War II was the Windhoek Reformed Church in the regional capital. The Windhoek Reformed Church (NGK), founded in 1929, was the fifth congregation of its denomination in Namibia, as was the Windhoek Reformed Church (NHK), founded on November 25, 1950, after those in Gobabis, Otjiwarongo, Grootfontein, and Outjo.

From 1935 to 1949, pastors from the Cape visited members of the Otjiwarongo, Outjo, and Keetmanshoop congregations, while pastors from Gobabis ministered in Windhoek, Aranos, Leonardville (part of the Aranos congregation), and Ghanzi. In 1950, Dr. D.C.S. van der Merwe was confirmed as Windhoek's first full-time pastor, and he stayed there until 1957, when he left to serve as a missionary at the Potchefstroom-Noord Reformed Church. The Rev. Johan van Ryssen had in 1949 already become the first pastor to serve Outjo regularly, until he left for Parys, Free State in 1953. Otjiwarongo started in 1955 with a full-time pastor, the Rev. M.W. van der Walt, who stayed there until 1958. According to the agreement by which the Otjiwarongo congregation seceded from Outjo, the Rev. Van der Walt preached 11 Sundays a year in Grootfontein, 11 in Walvis Bay and Usakos, and 22 in Otjiwarongo. In 1959, he was replaced by E.W. Meyer, who in 1965 accepted a post at the Pongola Reformed Church near Goedgegund, Swaziland.

In 1959, the centennial year of the GKSA, there were 12 congregations in South West Africa with 1,436 confirmed and 1,328 baptized members served by 4 pastors. In 1998, the two Klassis (Nossob and Etosha) included 1,887 confirmed and 877 baptized members served by 11 pastors. By 2014, there were 1,723 confirmed but only 481 baptized members. That year, 9 pastors were active in 17 congregations (18 including the missionary congregation known as the Sanveld Reformed Church). The Klassis Etosha included most of the congregations, but Aranos, Outjo, Biermanskool (known as Vanjaarsveld from 1955 to 1961 and from 1961 to 1985 as Outjo-West), Namib-Kus, and Khomas-Hoogland) belonged to Klassis Waterberg before their 2016 secession from the GKSA.

Bibliography 
 (af) Jooste, Prof. Dr. J.P. 1959. Die Geskiedenis van die Gereformeerde Kerk in Suid-Afrika 1859–1959. Potchefstroom: Administratiewe Buro van die Gereformeerde Kerk.
 (en) Potgieter, D.J. (ed.) 1972. Standard Encyclopaedia of Southern Africa. Cape Town: Nasionale Opvoedkundige Uitgewery Beperk.
 (af) Stassen, Nicol. 2009. Afrikaners in Angola 1928–1975. Pretoria: Protea Boekhuis.
 (af) Swart, Dr. M.J. (chairman: editing committee). 1980. Afrikaanse kultuuralmanak. Auckland Park: Federasie van Afrikaanse Kultuurvereniginge.
 (af) Viljoen, Lood (chairman). 2005. 75-jarige feesvieringe van die Gereformeerde kerk Gobabis 1930–2005. Gobabis: Gereformeerde Kerkraad.
 (af) Vogel, Rev. Willem. 2013. Die Almanak van die Gereformeerde Kerke in Suid-Afrika vir die jaar 2014. Potchefstroom: Administratiewe Buro.

See also 
 Annie van der Merwe

External links

Miscellaneous 
 (af) Dubbeldoor vir Swakop-kerke, Republikein, 11 December 2009. URL accessed 15 February 2015.
 (af) Die geskiedenis van die Windhoek Afrikaanse Privaatskool, wat ontstaan het in vyf katkisasielokale van die Gereformeerde kerk Windhoek-Suid. URL accessed 16 February 2015.
 (af) Sinode wil nie skeuring hê, Volksblad, 16 Januarie 2009. URL accessed 16 February 2015.

Churches 
 (af) Webtuiste van die Gereformeerde kerk Windhoek-Suid, die grootste tradisionele Gereformeerde gemeente in Namibië. URL accessed 16 February 2015.
 (af) Webtuiste van die Gereformeerde kerk Windhoek. URL accessed 16 February 2015.
 (af) Webtuiste van die Gereformeerde kerk Sanveld. URL accessed 16 February 2015.

References 

Reformed denominations in Africa
1929 establishments in South Africa